Athletics, for the 2013 Island Games, was held at the Bermuda National Stadium in Devonshire Parish, Bermuda. It took place from 15 – 19 July 2013.

Medal table
Final medal tally, based on the 2013 IG Athletics Medal Table page:

Results

Men

Women

References

Island Games
2013 Island Games
2013